The Snoqualmie Valley Regional Trail is a rail trail in King County, Washington. The  trail follows a portion of the former alignment of the Milwaukee Road, which was constructed in 1911 and abandoned in 1973.

The trail begins at Rattlesnake Lake outside of North Bend and ends at McCormick Park in Duvall.

History

The Milwaukee Road constructed its Snoqualmie Valley branch in 1911, and began passenger service on April 21, 1912.

Route

The trail parallels Cedar Falls Road before it heads east passing Rainbow Lake and down through the Boxley Creek drainage where a trestle bridge crosses a tributary of Boxley Creek. The trail intersects the eastern edge of a subdivision and crosses the South Fork of the Snoqualmie River. The trail continues under I-90 and crosses North Bend Way, running through North Bend. The path progresses the Mt. Si Golf Course to Reinig Bridge which crosses the Snoqualmie River.  The trail is interrupted by a short flight of 15 steps after the bridge. Users of the trail can re-access the main path by two different route connections.

The trail begins to head west and unofficially continues in an unimproved state for a quarter-mile east of Tokul Creek Road before reaching a gate at a property boundary. A further mile west, the trail crosses Tokul Creek Trestle situated over the Tokul Creek gorge. From there the path parallels Fall City Road through Carnation to the city of Duvall.

Access points
The access points to the trail are:

 Rattlesnake Lake, North Bend
 SE North Bend Way and SE Tanner Rd, North Bend
 NE 4th & Ballarat Ave, North Bend
 Three Forks off-leash Dog Park, Snoqualmie
 Tokul Creek SE, near Snoqualmie
 356th Pl SE, near Fall City
 Nick Loutsis Park, Carnation
 McCormick Park, Duvall

References

External links

 Snoqualmie Valley Trail Map
 Hike of the Week
 Snoqualmie Valley Regional Trail page on the King County Parks website
 King County Regional Trail Maps
 Small Overview map
 Regional Trail Map : PDF

Parks in King County, Washington
Rail trails in Washington (state)
Transportation in King County, Washington
National Recreation Trails in Washington (state)